Chibaite is a rare silicate mineral. It is a silica clathrate with formula  (n = 3/17 (max)). The mineral is cubic (diploidal class, m) and the silica hosts or traps various hydrocarbon molecules, such as methane, ethane, propane and isobutane.

Chibaite was first described for specimens collected from Arakawa, Minamibōsō, Chiba Prefecture, Honshu Island, Japan. The mineral was approved by the IMA in 2009.

References

 Gatta, C. B., Chibaite, American Mineralogist, New Mineral Names, Volume 97, pp 2064–2072, 2012

Silicate minerals
Cubic minerals
Clathrates
Organic minerals
Minerals described in 2009
Hydrocarbons